Elisavet Pesiridou (born 12 February 1992) is a Greek hurdler.

She was sixth at the 2016 European Championships in Amsterdam.

Her personal best in 100 metres hurdles is 12.93 seconds, which ranks her third among Greek 100 m hurdlers of all time. In the indoor event of 60 metres hurdles, Pesiridou's best (8,04 sec) ranks her in the second place of Greek female hurdlers, only behind Flora Redoumi.

Competition record

Personal bests

References

1992 births
Living people
Sportspeople from Katerini
Greek female hurdlers
Olympic athletes of Greece
Athletes (track and field) at the 2016 Summer Olympics
Mediterranean Games silver medalists for Greece
Mediterranean Games medalists in athletics
Athletes (track and field) at the 2018 Mediterranean Games
Athletes (track and field) at the 2022 Mediterranean Games
Athletes (track and field) at the 2020 Summer Olympics
20th-century Greek women
21st-century Greek women